Acacia argyraea is a shrub belonging to the genus Acacia and the subgenus Juliflorae that is endemic to tropical parts of northern Australia.

Description
It has smooth, grey to brown coloured bark with two or three angled branchlets covered in dense silky hairs. Like most species of Acacia it has phyllodes rather than true leaves. It blooms from April to July producing yellow flowers.

Distribution
It is native to an area of the Kimberley region of Western Australia, to the Northern Territory and north western Queensland north of around 20° in latitude, but is considered to be quite rare in Queensland. It is often in found around areas of shale, but also will grow in lateritic and sandy soils.

See also
List of Acacia species

References

argyraea
Acacias of Western Australia
Plants described in 1970
Taxa named by Mary Douglas Tindale